is a Japanese actor and vocalist of boyband Bullet Train.

Filmography

Film

Television

References

External links
 

1996 births
Living people
21st-century Japanese male actors